Sir Winston Churchill  (18 April 1620 – 26 March 1688), known as the Cavalier Colonel, was an English soldier, historian, and politician. He was the father of John Churchill, 1st Duke of Marlborough and a direct ancestor of his namesake Winston, who served as British prime minister in the 20th century during the Second World War.

Life and career
Churchill was the son of Sir John Churchill of Dorset, a lawyer and politician, and his wife Sarah Winston, daughter of Sir Henry Winston. Churchill was educated at St John's College, Oxford, but he left university without taking a degree. The main reason of it was the beginning of the Civil War.

Churchill was a fervent Royalist throughout his life. He fought and was wounded in the Civil War as a captain in the King's Horse and, after the Royalists were defeated, was forced to pay a recompense fee of £446 (equivalent to around £44,600 in the present day).

After the Restoration, he sat as a Member of Parliament for Weymouth and Melcombe Regis from 1661 to 1679 and for Lyme Regis from 1685 to 1688. He was also a Commissioner of the Irish Court of Claims and Explanations between 1662 and 1668, and a Junior Clerk Comptroller to the Board of Green Cloth from 1664 to 1679.

Churchill was knighted in 1664 and made a Fellow of the Royal Society the same year. He also published a history of the kings of England, entitled Divi Britannici; being a remark upon the Lives of all the Kings of this Isle, from the year of the World 2855 until the year of Grace 1660. He died in March 1688, at the age of 67.

Marriage and children
On 26 May 1648, Churchill married Elizabeth Drake, daughter of Sir John Drake (d. 25 August 1636) and his wife, Eleanor Boteler, daughter of John Boteler, 1st Baron Boteler of Brantfield, and maternal niece of George Villiers, 1st Duke of Buckingham.

They had eleven children, seven sons and four daughters, of whom only six survived infancy. Of their sons, Mountjoy died in infancy, while Winston died at the Battle of Solebay in 1672, aged 20. Jasper attended Queen's College, Oxford, and was commissioned in the Duke of York's Regiment in 1678, but he appears to have died soon thereafter. Theobald also attended Queen's College, took holy orders, became chaplain in his brother's regiment (Churchill's Dragoons) in 1683, but he died in 1685 at age 22.

Four of their children gained distinction: 
 John Churchill (1650–1722) became a famous military commander and was created Duke of Marlborough; 
George Churchill (1654–1710) became an admiral in the Royal Navy and never married; 
 Charles Churchill (1656–1714) became a general in the British Army under his eldest brother and married Mary Gould (later married to the 2nd Earl of Abingdon); 
 Arabella Churchill (1648–1730) became a mistress of King James II and mother of four of his children; among her descendants are Earl Waldegrave; the Earls Spencer; the Dukes of Berwick, and the later Dukes of Alba; Viscount Falmouth.

For many years he was unfaithful to his wife and his maid Betty.

Arabella became mistress of James, Duke of York in about 1665. In 1667, on most accounts, James obtained a commission for John in the Guards and, in 1675, John was commissioned captain in the Duke of York and Albany's Maritime Regiment. Charles was commissioned Ensign (in 1674) and Captain (1679) in the Duke of York's Regiment. George although pursuing a mainly Admiralty career, was commissioned Ensign (1676) and Lieutenant (1678) in the Duke of York's Regiment. Jasper was commissioned ensign in 1678, in the Duke of York's Regiment. Theobald, the cleric, stood out: he was commissioned Chaplain in November 1683, but in the King's Own Royal Regiment of Dragoons commanded then by John, Lord Churchill. Fifteen months after that, James, Duke of York, was king.

References

1620 births
1688 deaths
Alumni of St John's College, Oxford
Cavaliers
Fellows of the Royal Society
Winston Churchill (1620-1688)
17th-century soldiers
English MPs 1661–1679
English MPs 1685–1687
Knights Bachelor